The Things That Matter is the debut studio album by American country music artist Vince Gill. It was released in 1985 on RCA Nashville. Its lead-off single, "True Love", reached #32 on the Billboard country charts. This song was followed by "If It Weren't for Him" (a duet with Rosanne Cash) at #10, and "Oklahoma Borderline" at #9. The Cash duet was also Gill's first Top Ten country hit. "With You" was the final single, peaking at #33.

Track listing
All songs written by Vince Gill except where noted.

Personnel 

 Vince Gill – lead and backing vocals, guitars
 John Barlow Jarvis – keyboards (1-5, 7, 8)
 John Hobbs – keyboards (6)
 Billy Joe Walker Jr. – guitars (1-5, 7, 8)
 Richard Bennett – guitars (6)
 JayDee Maness – steel guitar
 Emory Gordy Jr. – bass guitar 
 Eddie Bayers – drums (1-5, 7, 8)
 Larrie Londin – drums (6)
 Mike Porter – percussion (6)
 John Catchings – cello (4)
 Edgar Meyer – double bass (4), arrangement assistance (4)
 Sara Fogel – viola (4)
 Jim Grosjean – viola (4)
 Kris Wilkinson – viola (4)
 Ted Madsen – violin (4)
 Connie McCollister – violin (4), concertmistress (4)
 Laura Molyneaux – violin (4)
 Betty Small – violin (4)
 Jennifer Kimball – backing vocals (1)
 Janis Oliver – backing vocals (1, 3)
 Herb Pedersen – backing vocals (3, 8)
 Rosanne Cash – lead vocals (6)
 Rodney Crowell – backing vocals (8)

Production 
 Emory Gordy Jr. – producer 
 Rob Santos – reissue producer 
 Jim Cotton – engineer, mixing 
 Joe Scaife – engineer, mixing
 Gordon Shyrock – engineer 
 David Ahlert – assistant engineer 
 George W. Clinton – assistant engineer
 Elliott Federman – mastering 
 Jeremy Holiday – production coordinator 
 Arlessa Barnes – project coordinator
 Stephanie Kika – project coordinator
 Robin Manning – project coordinator
 Brooke Nochomson – project coordinator
 Larry Parra – project coordinator
 Dana Renert – project coordinator
 Bill Stafford – project coordinator
 Steve Strauss – project coordinator
 Tom Tierney – project coordinator
 Traci Werbel – project coordinator
 John Hudson – product manager, art direction 
 Bill Brunt – art direction, design 
 Mandana Eidgah – art direction
 Christine Chagnon – reissue design 
 Mark Tucker – photography 
 June Miller – make-up 
 Rich Kienzie – liner notes

Chart performance

References
Allmusic (see infobox)

1985 debut albums
Albums produced by Emory Gordy Jr.
Vince Gill albums
RCA Records albums